A split-phase or single-phase three-wire system is a type of single-phase electric power distribution. It is the alternating current (AC) equivalent of the original Edison Machine Works three-wire direct-current system. Its primary advantage is that, for a given capacity of a distribution system, it saves conductor material over a single-ended single-phase system, while only requiring a single phase on the supply side of the distribution transformer.

This system is common in North America for residential and light commercial applications. Two 120 V AC lines are supplied to the premises that are out of phase by 180 degrees with each other (when both measured with respect to the neutral), along with a common neutral.  The neutral conductor is connected to ground at the transformer center tap. Circuits for lighting and small appliance power outlets (i.e., NEMA 1 and NEMA 5) use 120 V circuits—these are connected between one of the lines and neutral using a single-pole circuit breaker. High-demand applications, such as ovens, are often powered using 240 V AC circuits—these are connected between the two 120 V AC lines. These 240 V loads are either hard-wired or use NEMA 10 or NEMA 14 outlets which are deliberately incompatible with the 120 V outlets.

Other applications of a split-phase power system are used to reduce the electric shock hazard or to reduce electromagnetic noise.

Connections

A transformer supplying a three-wire distribution system has a single-phase input (primary) winding. The output (secondary) winding is center-tapped and the center tap connected to a grounded neutral. As shown in Fig. 1, either end to center has half the voltage of end-to-end. Fig. 2 illustrates the phasor diagram of the output voltages for a split-phase transformer. Since the two phasors do not define a unique direction of rotation for a revolving magnetic field, a split single-phase is not a two-phase system.

In the United States and Canada, the practice originated with the DC distribution system developed by Thomas Edison. By connecting pairs of lamps or groups of lamps on the same circuit in series, and doubling the supply voltage, the size of conductors was reduced substantially.

The line to neutral voltage is half the line-to-line voltage. Lighting and small appliances requiring less than 1800 watts may be connected between a line wire and the neutral. Higher wattage appliances, such as cooking equipment, space heating, water heaters, clothes dryers, air conditioners and electric vehicle charging equipment, are connected across the two line conductors. This means that (for the supply of the same amount of power) the current is halved. Hence, smaller conductors may be used than would be needed if the appliances were designed to be supplied by the lower voltage.

If the load were guaranteed to be balanced, then the neutral conductor would not carry any current and the system would be equivalent to a single-ended system of twice the voltage with the line wires taking half the current. This would not need a neutral conductor at all, but would be wildly impractical for varying loads; just connecting the groups in series would result in excessive voltage and brightness variation as lamps are switched on and off.

By connecting the two lamp groups to a neutral, intermediate in potential between the two live legs, any imbalance of the load will be supplied by a current in the neutral, giving substantially constant voltage across both groups. The total current carried in all three wires (including the neutral) will always be twice the supply current of the most heavily loaded half.

For short wiring runs limited by conductor ampacity, this allows three half-sized conductors to be substituted for two full-sized ones, using 75% of the copper of an equivalent single-phase system.

Longer wiring runs are more limited by voltage drop in the conductors. Because the supply voltage is doubled, a balanced load can tolerate double the voltage drop, allowing quarter-sized conductors to be used; this uses 3/8 the copper of an equivalent single-phase system.

In practice, some intermediate value is chosen. For example, if the imbalance is limited to 25% of the total load (half of one half) rather than the absolute worst-case 50%, then conductors 3/8 of the single-phase size will guarantee the same maximum voltage drop, totalling 9/8 of one single-phase conductor, 56% of the copper of the two single-phase conductors.

Balanced power
In a so-called balanced power system, sometimes called "technical power",  an isolation transformer with a center tap is used to create a separate supply with conductors at balanced voltages with respect to ground. The purpose of a balanced power system is to minimize the noise coupled into sensitive equipment from the power supply.

Unlike a three-wire distribution system, the grounded neutral is not distributed to the loads; only line-to-line connections at 120 V are used. A balanced power system is used only for specialized distribution in audio and video production studios, sound and television broadcasting, and installations of sensitive scientific instruments.

The U.S. National Electrical Code provides rules for technical power installations. The systems are not to be used for general-purpose lighting or other equipment, and may use special sockets to ensure only approved equipment is connected to the system. Additionally, technical power systems pay special attention to the way the distribution system is grounded.

A risk of using a balanced power system, in an installation that also uses "conventional" power in the same rooms, is that a user may inadvertently interconnect the power systems together via an intermediate system of audio or video equipment, elements of which might be connected to different power systems.  The chance of this happening may be reduced by appropriate labelling of the balanced power outlets and by the use of a type of power outlet socket for the balanced system that is physically different from that of the "conventional" power system to further differentiate them.

Applications

Europe
In Europe, three-phase 230/400 V is most commonly used. However, 230/460 V, three-wire, single-phase systems are used to run farms and small groups of houses when only two of the three-phase high-voltage conductors are used.  A split-phase final step-down transformer is then used, with the centre-tap earthed and the two halves usually supplying different buildings with a single phase supply, although in the UK a large farm may be given a 230-0-230 (nominal) supply.

In the UK, electric tools and portable lighting at larger construction and demolition sites are governed by BS7375, and where possible are recommended to be fed from a centre-tapped system with only 55 V between live conductors and the earth (so called CTE or Centre Tap Earth, or 55-0-55). This reduced low voltage system is used with 110 V equipment. No neutral conductor is distributed. In high hazard locations, additional double pole RCD protection may be used. The intention is to reduce the electrocution hazard that may exist when using electrical equipment at a wet or outdoor construction site, and eliminate the requirement for rapid automatic disconnection for prevention of shocks during faults. Portable transformers that transform single-phase 240 V to this 110 V split-phase system are a common piece of construction equipment. Generator sets used for construction sites are equipped to supply it directly.

An incidental benefit is that the filaments of 110 V incandescent lamps used on such systems are thicker and therefore mechanically more rugged than those of 240 V lamps.

North America
This three-wire single phase system is common in North America for residential and light commercial applications. Circuit breaker panels typically have two live (hot) wires, and a neutral, connected at one point to the grounded center tap of a local transformer. Usually, one of the live wires is black and the other one red; the neutral wire is always white. Single pole circuit breakers feed 120 volt circuits from one of the 120 volt buses within the panel, or two-pole circuit breakers feed 240 volt circuits from both buses. 120 V circuits are the most common, and used to power NEMA 1 and NEMA 5 outlets, and most residential and light commercial direct-wired lighting circuits. 240 V circuits are used for high-demand applications, such as air conditioners, space heaters, electric stoves, electric clothes dryers, water heaters, and electric vehicle charge points. These use NEMA 10 or NEMA 14 outlets that are deliberately incompatible with the 120 V outlets.

Wiring regulations govern the application of split-phase circuits. Since the neutral (return) conductor is not protected by a fuse or circuit breaker, a neutral wire can be shared only by two circuits fed from opposite lines of the supply system. Two circuits from opposing lines may share a neutral if both breakers are connected by a bar so that both trip simultaneously ( NEC 210.4), this prevents 120 V from feeding across 240 V circuits.

Railways
In Sweden split-phase electric power is also used on some railways. The center tap is grounded, one pole is fed with an overhead wire section, while the other wire is used for another section.

Amtrak's 60 Hz traction power system in the Northeast Corridor between New York and Boston also uses split-phase power distribution. Two separate wires are run along the track, the contact wire for the locomotive and an electrically separate feeder wire. Each wire is fed with 25 kV with respect to ground, with 50 kV between them. Autotransformers along the track balance the loads between the contact and feeder wires, reducing resistive losses.

In the UK Network Rail are using autotransformers on all new 50 Hz electrification, and (as of 2014) are converting many old booster transformer  installations to autotransformers, to reduce energy losses  and exported electromagnetic interference, both of which increase when longer, heavier, or faster trains are introduced, drawing higher peak current from the supply. Note that booster transformers only "boost" the return of traction current through its intended path, the "return conductor", rather than randomly through the earth, and do not boost, but rather reduce, the available voltage at the train, and introduce additional losses. The autotransformer system enforces the traction return current taking its intended path, while reducing the transmission losses, and therefore achieves both required objectives, of controlling return current leakage to earth and ensuring low energy loss, simultaneously. There is an initial cost penalty, because the previous return conductor, insulated to a fairly modest voltage, must be replaced by an anti-phase feeder, insulated to 25 kV, and the autotransformers themselves are larger and more expensive than the previous booster transformers; but over time the lower loss of energy results in overall costsavings.

See also
 Shared neutral

References

Electric power distribution
Electric motors
AC power